Carballedo is a municipality in the Spanish province of Lugo.

Municipalities in the Province of Lugo